The Eagle Huntress is a 2016 internationally co-produced Kazakh-language documentary film directed by Otto Bell and narrated by executive producer Daisy Ridley. It follows the story of Aisholpan Nurgaiv, a 13-year-old Kazakh girl from Mongolia, as she attempts to become the first female eagle hunter to compete in the eagle festival at Ulgii, Mongolia, established in 1999.

The film was shortlisted for an Academy Award for Best Documentary Feature but was ultimately not nominated. It was nominated for the BAFTA Award for Best Documentary.

Content

The Eagle Huntress follows the story of Aisholpan, a 13-year-old Kazakh girl from Mongolia, as she attempts to become the first female eagle hunter to compete in the eagle festival at Ulgii, Mongolia, established in 1999. She belongs to a family of nomads who spend their summers in a ger in the Altai Mountains and their winters in a house in town. The men in her family have been eagle hunters for seven generations, and she wants to follow in their footsteps.

With her father Nurgaiv's help, she learns how to train golden eagles, and then captures and trains her own eaglet. Although she faces some disbelief and opposition within the traditionally male sport, she becomes the first female to enter the competition at the annual Golden Eagle Festival. She ends up winning the competition, and her eaglet breaks a speed record in one of the events.

After the competition, she takes the final step toward becoming an eagle hunter by traveling with her father to the mountains in the winter to hunt foxes, braving snowy conditions and extreme cold. After some initial misses, her eaglet successfully kills its first fox and she returns home.

The film's dialog is in Kazakh; the narration is in English.

Music
The film's soundtrack features the original song "Angel by the Wings" by Sia, which was released worldwide on 2 December 2016.

Release
The Eagle Huntress premiered at the 2016 Sundance Film Festival, where it was purchased by Sony Pictures Classics for the US and Altitude Film Distribution in the UK. Afterwards, international distribution was handled by Sony Pictures Worldwide Acquisitions. Following the film's premiere, co-executive producer Daisy Ridley agreed to add narration, comprising approximately five minutes' total time in the 87-minute film. Director Otto Bell said of Ridley, "Like so many other theatergoers around the world, I was blown away by Daisy's recent portrayal of an empowered female protagonist [Rey in The Force Awakens]. I'm thrilled she'll be bringing that same energy to supporting a real-world heroine who is also on an epic journey to win victory in a far away land."

Reception
The documentary was a New York Times Critics Pick and an LA Times Critics Pick. Chief Film Critics at The New York Times, Manohla Dargis and A. O. Scott, called the film "a bliss out" and "a movie that expands your sense of what is possible", respectively. On review aggregator website Rotten Tomatoes, the film has a 94% approval rating based on 126 reviews with an average rating of 7.41/10. The website's critics consensus states: "Effectively stirring and bolstered by thrilling visuals, The Eagle Huntress uses its heartwarming message to fill up a feature that might have made for an even more powerful short film." Metacritic reports a 72 out of 100 score based on 20 reviews, indicating "generally favorable reviews".

Criticism
Some reviewers and researchers felt that the documentary overstated the amount of opposition Aisholpan faced as a female eagle hunter and that the early promotion of the film included an ethnocentric and distortive description of the Kazakh eagle hunting culture as being one of "ingrained misogyny" (IMDb description for initial 7 months from film's premiere). After historical evidence and facts were published about nomadic steppe women participating in training eagles to hunt from antiquity to the present day, the filmmakers corrected early reports placed in media outlets that Aisholpan was "the only" woman in the world hunting with an eagle. A 2014 article by a consultant on the film, Dennis Keen, suggests that women in Aisholpan's region faced a "knee-jerk reaction based on a traditionalist understanding of society and the sexes," such that their achievements "are dismissed by nearly every prominent falconer in Central Asia" because they represented "a serious disturbance in how things are done." Aisholpan has described the opposition she faced in her own words.

Despite Dennis Keen's above-noted assertion, in a 8 March 2014 article entitled "Он үшінде қондырған қолға қыран" (https://egemen.kz/article/29988-on-ushinde-qondyrghan-qolgha-qyran) by Suleimen Mamet for Egemen Qazaqstan news, eagle huntress, Makpal Abrazakova, said: "Realizing my enthusiasm, my father deliberately took me to the eagle hunters on the slopes of Alatau [Qazaqstan] and introduced me to the eagle hunters. I was blessed by such elders as Tleubek Esimbek, Aben Toktasynov, Seitzhan Kodekov. Seeing commitment and talent in me they bestowed me with an eaglet/baby eagle which they thought/predicted could become a best hunting eagle in the future." And in a 4 March 2014 article entitled "Falconry Tournament Tests Ancient Skills" (https://astanatimes.com/2014/03/falconry-tournament-tests-ancient-skills/) by Asset Kalymov for The Astana Times news, two of the men mentioned in the above-noted article as having blessed Makpal's eagle hunting career were described as: "famous berkutchis Aben Toktasynuly and Seitzhan Kodekov whose efforts in the early 1990s helped revive this Kazakh tradition." Thus, the men Dennis Keen cites as objecting are only a subset of prominent eagle hunters, and the very men who blessed Makpal's engagement were elders integrally important to the resurrection of the eagle hunting tradition in Kazakhstan during post-Soviet rule.

In addition, although Dennis Keen served as a voluntary film consultant to Otto Bell, he failed to discover the existence of other Kazakh eagle festival participants such as Akbota Bagashar, or Gulaida Zhorobekova, an eagle (and other birds of prey) falconer of Kyrgyzstan, both of whom also preceded Aisholpan Nurgaiv in terms of female engagement in eagle falconry in Central Asia. In an article dated 26 February 2013 by Nadezhda Plyaskina called "The Basic Instinct" with a photo by Roman Egorov,  Akbota Bagashar is noted as having competed at the "Sonar-2013" festival, near Nura, a 3 day competition with 40 competitors, involving shirga (lures) and live prey. In that article she said she began going out on hunts with her grandfather as a child and went on her first hunt with her own eagle at age 15. At the 2013 festival in Nura she was awarded a prize by virtue of being the only female competing.

Legacy
Aisholpan stated her desire to study medicine and become a doctor. The filmmakers made Aisholpan and her family "profit participants" in the documentary and established a fund to help pay for Aisholpan's higher education. They also donated the $3,000 prize money they received from winning Best Documentary at the Hamptons International Film Festival to this fund.

References

External links

 
 
 
 
 The Eagle Huntress – Soaring Cinematography Featurette
 

2010s adventure films
2016 documentary films
2010s sports films
2016 films
American adventure films
American sports documentary films
British adventure films
Falconry
Films set in Mongolia
Kazakh-language films
Mongolian documentary films
Sony Pictures Classics films
British sports documentary films
2010s American films
2010s British films
Documentary films about children